Mansfield is a market town and the administrative centre of the Mansfield District in Nottinghamshire, England. It is the largest town in the wider Mansfield Urban Area (followed by Sutton-in-Ashfield). It gained the Royal Charter of a market town in 1227. It had a population of 110,500 at the 2021 census, according to the Office for National Statistics. Mansfield is the one local authority in Nottinghamshire with a publicly elected mayor.

History

Roman to Medieval Period
Settlement dates to the Roman period. Major Hayman Rooke in 1787 discovered a villa between Mansfield Woodhouse and Pleasley; a cache of denarii was found near King's Mill in 1849. Early English royalty stayed there; Mercian Kings used it as a base to hunt in Sherwood Forest.

The Royal Manor of Mansfield was held by the King. In 1042 Edward the Confessor possessed a manor in Mansfield. William the Conqueror later owned two carucates, five sochmans, and thirty-five villains; twenty borders, with nineteen carucates and a half in demesne, a mill, piscary, twenty-four acres of meadow and pasture in Mansfield.

In the time of Henry II of England, the king visited what is now known as Kings Mill, staying at the home of Sir John Cockle for a night having been hunting in Sherwood Forest. Sir John Cockle was later known as the Miller of Mansfield.William Horner Groves, The History of Mansfield, (1894) retrieved on the 13 February 2023.In 1199 the Manor was owned by King John. King John used to visit Mansfield frequently between 1200-1216, that he built a residence here. Later,  King Edward I held a Royal Council in the town. The Manor, then owned by King Henry III, subsequently passed to Henry de Hastings. In 1329 Queen Isabella, mother of Edward III, was the Lady of the Manor of Mansfield.

The Domesday Book (1086) recorded the settlement as Mammesfeld and market-petition documents of 1227 spelt it Maunnesfeld. King Richard II signed a warrant in November 1377 to grant tenants the right to hold a four-day fair each year; the spelling had changed to Mannesfeld. There are remains of the 12th-Century King John's Palace in Clipstone, between Mansfield and Edwinstowe, and it was an area of retreat for royal families and dignitaries through to the 15th Century. Access to the town was by road from the city of Nottingham, on the way to Sheffield. In the town centre, a commemorative plaque was erected in 1988 together with a nearby tree to mark the point thought once to be the centre of Sherwood Forest. The plaque was refurbished in 2005 and moved to a ground-plinth.Town stakes a claim to Robin Hood BBC News, 19 July 2005, Retrieved 9 November 2020.

Tudor and Stuart Periods
In 1516, during the reign of King Henry VIII, an act of parliament settled the Manor to Thomas, Duke of Norfolk. The Manor was then passed to the Dukes of Newcastle and Portland.

Travellers in the 16th and 17th centuries had several inns and stable yards dating from the medieval period to stop at:

the Harte; the Swan, with 1490 dating stone; the Talbot; the White Bear; the Ram, with timber from before 1500; and the White Lion.. Several timber-framed cruck buildings were demolished in 1929; and in 1973 a local historical society documented another during demolition dated to 1400 or earlier. Other Tudor houses in Stockwell Gate, Bridge St, and Lime Tree Place were also demolished to make way for development before they could be viewed for listing. Most remaining buildings are from the 17th century. The Swan was rebuilt in 1584, and became a coaching inn in the 1820’s/30s. 

In the 1640s George Fox lived in Mansfield and worked as a shoemaker. Mansfield became the birth place of the Quakers religion, after George had a revelation walking past St Peter and St Paul's Church, Mansfield. George felt compelled to preach to others as a result of this revelation. This was during the time of the English Civil War. There is a Quakers Heritage Trail in the town for those who want to learn about the Quakers origin. George was later imprisoned for the first time in Nottingham in 1649.    George met Elizabeth Hooton at her home in nearby Skegby, she is usually considered to be the first person to accept the doctrines of Quakerism. 
18th Century
Robert Dodsley who wrote book of ‘The King and the Miller of Mansfield’ was a stocking weaver in the town. Robert became one of the foremost publishers of that day. He published Dr Samuel Johnson’s London in 1738. Later, Robert suggested and helped finance Johnson’s dictionary of the English Language. 

The Moot Hall in the Mansfield Market Place was erected in 1752 by Henrietta Harley, Countess of Oxford and Countess Mortimer. 

John Throsby in 1790 described Mansfield as ‘a flourishing and genteel market town, general well built.....and is certainly an ancient place, and some think of high antiquity’. 

19th century
In 1894 William Horner Groves described Mansfield as one of the quaintest and most healthy of the towns in the Midland counties, is the market town for an agricultural district of eight miles around it. It is the capital of the Broxtowe Hundred of Nottinghamshire, and gives its name to a Parliamentary Division of the county'

Ancient markets

Mansfield is a market town with a 700-year-old market tradition; a Royal charter was issued in 1227. The present market square was created after demolition under the Improvement Act of 1823. In the centre is the Bentinck Memorial, built in 1849, which commemorates Lord George Bentinck (1802–1848), son of the William Bentinck, 4th Duke of Portland, a local landowner.

A nearby area called Buttercross Market in West Gate, the site of an old cattle market, has a centrepiece of local stone dating from the 16th century. Mansfield District Council closed this section in 2015. Adjacent is Mansfield Library, officially opened by Queen Elizabeth II in 1977 and refurbished in 2012. The old Carnegie Library, founded in 1905 in Leeming Street, was used from 1976 as an arts and performance centre.

Geography and climate
Mansfield has a temperate oceanic climate (Köppen: Cfb), with a narrow temperature range, an even spread of rainfall, low levels of sunshine and often breezy conditions throughout the year. The closest weather-station records for Mansfield come from Warsop in Meden Vale, seven miles to the north.

In a typical year the warmest day should reach  and 12.72 days should reach  or higher.

There is air frost on an average of 59 nights a year.

Rainfall averages 634 mm a year, with 113 days reporting in excess of 1 mm of rain (observation period 1971–2000).

Economy

Town centre

Mansfield has a large market place within its commercial and retail centre. The main market area was re-surfaced in 2005. In 2016 the council moved all market stalls from the old Buttercross Market in Westgate to join those sited in the main market area.
Surroundings includes a museum, the Palace Theatre, restaurants, fast-food outlets, pubs, bars and night clubs.

On 6 April 2010 a town-centre Business Improvement District (BID) was founded with offices in the old Town Hall, financed by 2 per cent extra on the rateable value of nearby businesses.

The BID operates on a five-year basis, with a rolling yearly operational plan. Before its tenure ended in 2015, over 560 shops and other town-centre businesses were canvassed in late 2014 to vote on the first continuation period. Mansfield District Council contracted out of the procedure at a projected cost to council taxpayers of £8,000. On a 55 per cent turnout, 77 per cent voted to extend the BID for another five years.

The BID's additional services (beyond the council's baseline statutory services) and delivery of projects enhance the town's shopping centre. It offers events to attract visitors and raise awareness and security for the town centre, including banning orders and improved shop frontages.

Records show the first yearly income to have been £294,697, with an operating surplus of £151,610. One achievement in 2012–2013 was a crowd-funded town centre Wi-Fi internet installation costing £37,000, and completed by June 2013, using a network of AP nodes requiring registration for free use, and dedicated optional BID local information "App" for Android and iPhone available for download. The intentions were to encourage shoppers and visitors to linger in the town centre for longer, to offer internet access to small businesses, and to provide market traders with a means of accepting non-cash payments.

Other BID moves have been "gating off" alleyways blighted by anti-social behaviour, improving signage, and enhancing cleansing operations. Several shopkeepers complained in 2011 that the BID was "not doing enough to boost town trade." In 2012, Mansfield Constituency Labour Party criticised the BID for receiving almost a million pounds in its first three years, with little to show for it.

In 2015 Mansfield BID moved out of its offices in the old Town Hall to allow structural repairs, relocating nearby. A mandatory ballot, required every five years, occurred in late 2014, and again in late 2019, resulting in a decision to renew the organisation.

In January 2022, the council announced an intention to purchase and redevelop the old Beale's town-centre store and to relocate all existing staff along with external partnerships and new participants, swelling the daily footfall which would bolster existing retail traders. Funding for the scheme, named Mansfield Connect, will be determined by a Levelling Up grant. In January 2023, the levelling up funding of 20 million pounds for the project had been agreed by the UK government.

Also in February 2022 Severn Trent Water shared its £76 million Green Recovery Project for flood alleviation investment for the town. This includes rain garden areas around the Market Place, a memorial garden at the back of the Old Town Hall and a pocket park with a slide for children in the existing green space on the corner of Walkden Street/Quaker Way.

Retail
Among Mansfield's retail outlets is the Four Seasons shopping centre created in 1973–1976, with over 50 units occupied by national chains and phone shops. Primark nationally took over the former Littlewoods premises, closing the Mansfield store and its associated in-house business Index) in 2005. The Primark premises underwent a refit in 2017. Other stores and a coffee chain have traded in West Gate since 2011, along with existing similar cafés. 

BHS closed in 2016 and Beales in 2020. Debenhams' closure, part of a national sequence due to the Arcadia Group's financial failure, was announced in late 2020, followed by Burtons, Topman and Topshop.

Rosemary Centre, built as a large weaving shed in 1907 by John Harwood Cash and converted to retail in 1984, is a pedestrianised area off the town centre with a covered streetside parade. Argos relocated in 2017 to new owner Sainsbury's store. There are also three outdoor retail parks, two with adjacent branded fast-food outlets.

The site of the old bus station on Rosemary Street is now home to three fast food outlets, Taco Bell, Tim Hortons and Domino's Pizza

Civic Centre
The headquarters of Mansfield District Council were relocated to a new-build occupying part of a former recreation ground at Chesterfield Road South from August 1986, bringing together workers from 12 offices across the district. The project took two years and over-ran the anticipated cost by £1 million, totalling £6.7 million, then the council's biggest spending scheme. it was opened in 1987 by Princess Anne. Catering facilities are run by outside contractors.

From 2012, surplus office space was rented to outside concerns. Working with Ashfield District Council to cut costs, the legal services of both authorities were combined in existing ADC offices at Kirkby in Ashfield. Their joint regeneration service began earlier. The council decided in 2014 to close the Civic Centre counter-payments facility.

Job Centre Plus, an agency within the Department for Work and Pensions, moved in 2018 from two town-centre venues to the re-modelled Civic Centre interior ground floor. The vacated offices were intended for redevelopment as housing and retail.

Mansfield Community Partnership was created at the Civic Centre as a centralised hub for law and order, with police, street wardens, housing, domestic abuse and anti social behaviour officers in a dedicated town-centre unit.

In October 2021, the council announced a plan to create a new community hub at the old town hall in the town centre, intending to relocate staff together with other parties having vested interests in the present building and area. The project will be subject to a successful bid for funding from central government under the Levelling up scheme announced in 2021. The Civic Centre is proposed to be redeveloped.

Former employment and industry
 
Wolverhampton & Dudley Breweries in October 1999 acquired Mansfield Brewery, once the United Kingdom's largest independent brewery, for £253 million. Production ceased in 2002, and the Mansfield range of ales moved to manufacturing facilities around the country; the site was later sold to Pubmaster Ltd, and from the 2020s is being redeveloped as housing.

In the 1980s, Mansfield Bitter was advertised with a photograph of then US President Ronald Reagan and the tagline: "He might be president of the most powerful nation on earth... but he's never had a pint of Mansfield." "Not much matches Mansfield" was also used and became the title for a play set in the town, written by Kevin Fegan for the Mansfield Arts Festival. A similar 1989 advert contained the wording "He might be the life and soul of the Party...But he's never had a pint of Mansfield." featured Mikhail Gorbachev, then president of the Soviet Union.

Mansfield's old-established soft drink manufacturer, R. L. Jones, with brand names Sunecta and Mandora, was bought by Mansfield Brewery in 1977. A move to a modern factory in Bellamy Road in 1975 released land projected for a high-density housing development known as Layton Burroughs. Mansfield Brewery sold the business in 1988 for £21.5 million to the Scottish drinks company A. G. Barr plc, producer of Irn-Bru, Tizer, and Mandora. At the time the firm employed 400 people. Production ceased there in January 2011 when A. G. Barr moved production to other sites.

After demolition of the brewery production buildings in 2008, the site remained unsold, with various projected uses mooted. Used temporarily since February 2015 as a trailer park, Mansfield planning department refused further consent in October 2015. One local councillor suggested it could be turned into a town farm, but instead a rented housing development was completed by 2021.

The older ornate office building 'Chadburn House' initially housed an interactive learning centre from 2002. It closed in April 2015, and was turned into office space for businesses, including the local newspaper, and a micro brewery with a cafe and bar.

Many areas near the town still show signs of coal mining, the main industry for most of the 20th century. A violent episode in the UK miners' strike (1984–1985) occurred in Mansfield on May Day 1984. Most of the area's miners had voted against a strike, but the local union initially maintained that the strike was official to show solidarity with strikers in other areas. When the coal board granted an extra day of leave after the bank holiday, a group of working miners confronted union officials and violence broke out with striking miners. Mansfield later hosted a breakaway union, the Union of Democratic Mineworkers, which recruited many who had opposed the 1984–1985 strike.

The head stocks close to the village of Clipstone are an important local landmark and community groups are trying to preserve them as a reminder of the area's mining history. As demand for coal fell, Mansfield's pits wound down and miners had to find other work.

Mining subsidence causes problems for properties around Mansfield. A few streets in and around the town form long rows of terraced houses reminiscent of the affordable housing provided for mine workers in the prime of the industry. Many were demolished in 2012 in Pleasley Hill, Market Warsop and elsewhere. The Coal Authority is based in the town.

Regeneration

Several urban regeneration projects planned for Mansfield involved large-scale demolition, but the financial crisis of 2007–2008 and subsequent central-government funding cuts and escalating austerity measures deferred them. Mansfield District Council promoted two new developments: Arrival Square, opened 2008, an office block occupied by the Probation Service by the rail station; and Queen's Place—completed and opened by the mayor, Tony Egginton, in late 2013—which cost the council £2.4 million. It offered two new ground-floor retail units and six offices in Queen Street between the new transport interchange and the market square.

Reconstruction of the nearby King's Mill Hospital, part of which was completed by 2009, is near to the MARR road (Mansfield and Ashfield Regeneration Route) which opened in 2004, a bypass route around the town designed to reduce traffic through-flow and improve public access by connecting the A617 at Pleasley to the A617 at Rainworth.

In 2009 Mansfield made a bid for city status, appending redevelopment plans for retail, residential and leisure facilities with road improvements gradually being made; still pending as of August 2020.

In 2019 the UK government set up the Towns Fund, which aimed to regenerate areas in need of regeneration. Mansfield was one of these places with the aim of receiving £25 million for its regeneration and development. This is to part with The Mansfield Townscape Heritage Project, which provided grants by the National Lottery to renovate parts of the town centre.

There has been a significant number of new homes and developments being built or planned in Mansfield such as those of the Berry Hill development to name one which includes 1700 homes, a hotel, health centre, Primary School, care home and offices

Transport

Railway

Mansfield railway station is on the Robin Hood Line, which connects the town with Nottingham and Worksop; the line was opened in 1995. Trains run generally at hourly intervals each way.

History
The town was originally the terminus of the Mansfield and Pinxton Railway, a horse-drawn plateway built in 1819 and one of the first acquisitions of the newly formed Midland Railway. The Midland used the final section to extend its new Leen Valley line to the present station in 1849.

Mansfield had two railway stations: Mansfield Town, the former Midland station on Station Road; and Mansfield Central, the former Mansfield Railway station in Great Central Road, near Ratcliffe Gate.

The Midland Railway extended its Rolleston Junction–Southwell branch to Mansfield in 1871; continued the line north to Worksop in 1875; opened a link from Mansfield Woodhouse to Westhouses and Blackwell in 1886; and completed another link from Pleasley through Bolsover to Barrow Hill in 1890. The locally promoted Mansfield Railway, between Kirkby South Junction and Clipstone Junction, broke the Midland Railway monopoly; it was opened in stages between 1913 and 1916 for goods trains and, in 1917, for Nottingham–Ollerton passenger trains, calling at a second Mansfield passenger station. Though nominally independent, the Mansfield Railway connected at both ends with the Great Central Railway, which worked the trains.

Central station lost its scheduled passenger services at the beginning of 1956 and Town station closed to passengers in 1964, leaving Mansfield without a passenger railway service until 1995. During this period, Mansfield was, by some definitions, the largest town in Britain without a railway station. The closest station was located at Alfreton; between 1973 and 1995, it was named Alfreton and Mansfield Parkway to encourage use as a railhead for Mansfield.

In 1995, the Robin Hood line restored passenger services and was officially reopened by Secretary of State for Transport, Sir George Young. A Sunday service was restored to Mansfield in December 2008.

Mansfield & District Light Railways ran a tram service between 1905 and 1932.

Road
The M1 motorway lies west of Mansfield.

The A60 road runs north–south through Mansfield, between Nottingham and Worksop. The A617 road skirts around the town, providing a road link eastwards towards Newark-on-Trent as well as westwards towards Chesterfield and the M1.

The A38 road, the longest 2-digit A-road in Great Britain, terminates at Mansfield, and provides the town with a direct link to Derby.

Buses

Buses in Mansfield are operated mainly by Stagecoach, with Trent Barton and National Express also working the area. The council granted planning permission for a new bus station on the former Station Road car park, expected to cost £7 million, in 2006. The old bus station, built in 1977, handled around 1,500 buses and 16,000 passenger arrivals a day; however, it  had an outdated design and appearance, and poor outdoor waiting facilities.

There were good pedestrian links to the pedestrianised town-centre shopping streets; however, the railway station was several hundred yards away. The new bus station addressed the problem, but proved unpopular with shopkeepers near the old facility, with several claiming marked reductions in trade.

The new bus station and transport interchange opened on 31 March 2013 in a location on a former car park, close to the railway station. It is part of a regeneration scheme known as Gateway to Mansfield, which aims to give visitors a clean and tidy first impression, including buildings with a themed use of local sandstone. The scheme also aims to improve facilities for locals, boost visitors to the town and help step up the local economy.

The new bus station increased passenger safety and provides a more welcoming scene for arriving visitors. Improvements have included an enclosed waiting area, automatic doors for fume reduction and safety, a tourist information centre, electronic bus and rail departure information, toilets and baby-changing facilities. A tower with lift and stairs to an elevated walkway connects it to the railway station.

Air 
The closest airport to Mansfield is East Midlands Airport followed by Birmingham Airport.

Sport

Mansfield is home to Mansfield Town FC, known as the Stags or yellows. Relegated to the Conference National after 77 years in the Football League at the end of the 2007–2008 season, Mansfield Town returned to the Football League after winning the 2012–2013 Conference National title. Non-League club AFC Mansfield plays in the Forest Town area of Mansfield.

Mansfield Rugby Club is a rugby union club based at Eakring Road and currently plays in Midlands 1 East, a sixth-tier league in the English rugby union system. It won the Notts Cup for five years in succession and for a record 18 times.

Mansfield Giants is Mansfield's Premier Basketball Club, and has a three-star Accreditation and Club Mark from the English Sports Council. The team plays in the England Basketball (EB2).

The annual half marathon held for more than 30 years was cancelled after 2011 due to escalating costs, after changes to Health and Safety legislation meant professional services were needed to address road-closure measures, instead of volunteers. Mansfield local business networking group 2020 had hoped to restore a race by September 2014, but this event, reduced in length to 10 kilometres, was postponed, initially until spring 2015, and took place in August.

Angling is well supported in the Mansfield district, where ponds remain from the former textile milling industry.

Tennis is catered for by Mansfield Lawn Tennis Club located at the same site since 1883, with two grass courts and four asphalt courts, three of them floodlit. Further hard-surface courts are found in the district at six Mansfield District Council park locations.

Mansfield is home to Mansfield Roller Derby, Mansfield's premier Flat Track Roller Derby league.

One issue for local residents is Mansfield's lack of a central Leisure Centre. Mansfield District Council decided it would rubber stamp the sale of the existing Leisure Centre and extensive public car park to Tesco, which opened a large Tesco Extra store in 2007. The Council asserted that this would be replaced by a brand new Leisure Centre, but nothing has been built or is planned. It received over £5m from Tesco for the Leisure Centre site, but decided to spend this on refurbishing Sherwood Baths instead.

Mansfield has two indoor swimming centres and a third, smaller pool attached to a school, which has been under threat of closure since 2011. These facilities give Mansfield the largest square meterage of indoor water-sports facilities per capita of any town in the United Kingdom with less than 100,000 inhabitants.

Mansfield is one of three outlets for the Nottinghamshire County Council Swim Squad, which competes as Nova Centurion. The Sherwood Swimming Baths adjacent to the former Sherwood Colliery was refurbished and opened in January 2010 as the Rebecca Adlington Swimming Centre. The 25-metre pool was widened at the expense of losing tiered public seating and has a new, small, endless stroke-improvement training pool with variable-resistance water flow. The complex reduces its carbon footprint by using a ground-source heat pump backed by a biomass boiler burning wood pellets prepared from waste by a local wood yard.

At the Beijing 2008 Olympic Games, a Mansfield contestant, Rebecca Adlington, won two gold medals, for 400 and 800-metre freestyle swimming. After her record-breaking success, Adlington was welcomed home to Mansfield by thousands lining the streets to applaud as she passed in an open top bus. This culminated in an appearance at the old Town Hall in the Market Square. Her success boosted swimming interest in the area, leading to expansion of swimming classes to encourage young people to begin swimming. At the 2012 Olympic Games in and around London, Adlington won two Bronze medals again for 400 and 800 metres, the best performance of a generally disappointing Team GB swimming squad. She retired from competitive swimming in February 2012.

Water Meadows swimming complex opened during the Christmas holidays of 1990 in Bath Street, on the site of the former Mansfield Baths and defunct cattle market. It has a gym and a soft-play area for children with an adjoining café, as well as one 25-metre competition pool, two other pools, and a small teaching pool. The leisure lagoon pool has an artificial wave machine operating periodically, and also a slide and a shallow area like a beach. The complex is popular with family groups, and many surrounding schools make use of its facilities.

Mansfield Bowling Club is reputed to have origins in the 1700s. The club played at a bowling green to the rear of the Bowl in Hand pub in the town centre, until relocating into the grounds of Queen Elizabeth's Academy, with a new facility including pavilion opening in 2009.

Parks

Titchfield Park

On the same site as the Water Meadows swimming complex, offers large grassy areas on both sides of the river Maun, crossed by two footbridges. It has a bowls green, hard tennis courts, a basketball court, a children's play area, and many flowerbeds.

Fisher Lane Park

Nearby stretches from the top of Littleworth through to Rock Hill. It is popular with dog walkers, kite flyers and skaters, as Mansfield District Council installed a concrete skate plaza, causing some local controversy. However, the skate plaza has proved popular with local young people. Some rides and stalls for local children are set up in the park in the summer.

Carr Bank Park

 

Also close to the town, has a rocky grotto, a bandstand and summer flower beds. It has a war memorial built of local sandstone, dedicated to soldiers killed in action since the end of the Second World War, to complement the original setting unveiled after the First War in 1921.

Cemeteries and crematorium
The main cemetery and crematorium occupy a 10-acre site accessed from Derby Road, on the southern edge of town near to the boundary with Ashfield. They share a car park. In late 2015, Mansfield District Council recognised the need for additional spaces and planning consent was obtained. The older part of the cemetery, fronting Nottingham Road and Forest Hill (the old Derby Road) has on-street parking. Site access on foot can be hard due to the steep slope.

The cemetery was opened in 1857 due to insufficient church graveyard space, the mid-to-late Victorian population growth and several then-new churches built with little or no dedicated graveyard areas. A 10-acre extension was made in 1898. Registered by the Commonwealth War Graves Commission as 'Nottingham Road Cemetery', this cemetery contains the war graves of 51 Commonwealth service personnel of World War I and 45 from World War II.

The adjacent Mansfield and District Crematorium, with two chapels seating 35 and up to 80, was set up in 1960. and is a responsibility shared between Mansfield District Council, Ashfield District Council and Newark and Sherwood District Council.

There are other cemeteries on the A60 at Mansfield Woodhouse and at Warsop, and off the A617 at Pleasley Hill.

Entertainment
The Palace Theatre in Leeming St is the town's prime entertainment venue. Built as a cinema in 1910 and originally known as the Palace Electric Theatre, it was adapted as a theatre with a proscenium arch, presenting live shows. It was known as the Civic Hall and Civic Theatre before the current name was revived in 1995. With a seating capacity of 534, the theatre is a mid-scale touring venue. It presents a programme of professional and amateur productions and a yearly pantomime.

Mansfield Museum, beside the Palace Theatre in Leeming Street, opened in 1904. and has been based on its present site since 1938. With free entry, it won the Guardian Family-friendly Museum of the Year Award in 2011.

Mansfield was home to Venue 44, a nightclub that gave birth to the superclub Renaissance which was operated there in 1992–1994 by Geoff Oakes and launched the DJ's Sasha, John Digweed, Nigel Dawson and Ian Ossia to global fame. The building was demolished in 2010.

The Old Library near the town centre houses a recording studio, meeting room and 100-seat Studio Theatre. Mansfield also has a large Odeon Cinemas on a new retail and entertainment park outside of the town centre. The previous ABC town-centre cinema was used as a snooker centre until closure in 2012, but late in 2013 it was converted into a church.

Mansfield Super Bowl, a 28-lane alley with hospitality, opened in 1991. Facing closure in 2014, it was sold and refurbished in 2015.

The Intake, a live-music venue in Kirkland Avenue, closed in 2016. The Town Mill, a former waterside mill on the banks of the Maun at the edge of the town centre, was turned into a pub and live music venue in 2002, but closed in 2010, citing the smoking ban, rising beer prices and recession among its reasons for failure.

Mansfield is close to the East Midlands Designer outlet.

Sherwood Forest

A few miles outside Mansfield lies Sherwood Forest. Sherwood Forest is a royal forest.  

Mansfield had an oak tree and a plaque in West Gate to mark what was the centre of Sherwood Forest. Now the tree has been felled and a giant metallic feather has replaced it as a marker. This has been named A Spire for Mansfield

Some residents of the town feel this is an eyesore, and the feather sculpture has been plagued by health and safety problems.

Summer in the Streets
Every year between June and August, Mansfield District Council hosts a Summer in the Streets festival. This consists of various public events held all across the town over many days, such as children's entertainment, fairground rides in the market square, and hands-on workshops for things like crafts and circus skills.

The festival highlight is a final event in Titchfield Park called Party in the Park. Its range of entertainment includes live music acts by local bands, performances from local dance groups, and activities such as face painting. For 2012 and 2013, this culminating event was cancelled for austerity reasons.

On 21 August 2010 the various summer entertainment arranged by Mansfield District Council included the Irish boy band Westlife in a live concert at Field Mill stadium, home to the town's football team, the Stags. This was the first big-name act to visit the town.

Media

The local newspapers are the Chad (formerly Chronicle Advertiser) and Mansfield and Ashfield News Journal, a community newspaper. Mansfield's radio station, Mansfield 103.2, broadcasts from Fishpond Hill in Skegby Lane, from a transmitter that also broadcasts Mansfield versions of Nottingham stations BBC Radio Nottingham and Capital Midlands, on 95.5 and 96.5 FM respectively. DAB broadcasts from Fishpond Hill began on 21 July 2006 with the NOW Nottingham multiplex. Subsequently, the Digital One and BBC National muxes were added (during 2006 and 2007).

Television reception in Mansfield is often poor due to its location between regions. Historically, Mansfield has been part of the BBC North and Yorkshire Television regions. Between 1965 and 1974, some homes in Mansfield even received Anglia Television.

Since the 1995 arrival of Diamond Cable (latterly ntl, then finally Virgin Media), BBC East Midlands and ITV Central East has been provided, and since regionalisation of SKY digital, many residents now receive BBC East Midlands and ITV Central, which are the default channels for this area and appear on channels 101 and 103.

Mansfield receives its television signals from various transmitters: Waltham from East Midlands, Emley Moor from South and West Yorkshire, and Belmont from East Yorkshire and Lincolnshire. This meant that the celebrations for Rebecca Adlington's success at the 2008 Beijing Olympics, though covered officially by East Midlands Today, could be shown on both East Midlands Today and Look North, so that all the Mansfield area could watch.

Politics

Mansfield has a directly elected mayor, as one of only 16 places with one in the United Kingdom. Tony Egginton was Mayor of Mansfield from October 2002 until retirement in May 2015, being replaced at scheduled elections by a fellow candidate for the Mansfield Independent Forum political party, Kate Allsop. Much was said of the first Executive Mayor, but during his time in office, Mansfield struggled with local land development and many projects across the region faltered.

Egginton (in office 2002–2015) was criticised by some councillors and residents for placing too much focus on self-publicity, as opposed to publicity for the town. The issue was raised again after his prominent role in Olympic swimmer Rebecca Adlington's homecoming ceremony, after her Gold Medal successes at the 2008 Beijing Olympic games.

In April 2017, Sophie Whitby was elected to the Mansfield district as a Member of Youth Parliament, on a manifesto that included promoting equality for the LGBT community.

Benjamin Bradley has been the constituency (Conservative) Member of Parliament since May 2017, succeeding Sir Alan Meale (Labour), who served the town for 30 years.

On 5 May 2019, Andy Abrahams was elected as the Mayor of Mansfield, winning by just 2 votes, and also became the first directly elected Labour Executive Mayor.

From 2010 the Parliamentary Constituency boundaries were realigned to include areas to the north of Mansfield around Warsop, previously part of the Bassetlaw constituency.

In the news
The 2005 and 2007 editions of Channel 4's programme The Best and Worst Places to Live in the UK named Mansfield as the sixth and ninth worst place to live in Britain respectively, largely due to poor school performance. The town did not feature in the list for 2019.

In June 2014, husband and wife Christopher and Susan Edwards were jailed for murdering the woman's parents, William and Patricia Wycherley, whose bodies lay undiscovered in their back garden for 15 years. The couple had stolen thousands of pounds, siphoned off the Wycherleys' pensions and sold their house, amounting to nearly £300,000. The bodies were found after the Edwardses gave themselves up, having spent a year in France knowing the DWP intended to interview the murdered Mr Wycherley, who would have been approaching his 100th birthday. Susan Edwards, a former librarian, had written Christmas cards and letters to relatives telling them her parents were travelling in Ireland "because of the good air" and told neighbours they were in Blackpool or Morecambe. The Edwardses were sentenced to life imprisonment with a minimum of 25 years for the murders, concurrent with 9-year sentences for disposing of the bodies and theft. The Landscapers (TV series) tells the story of Susan and Christopher Edwards, which aired on Sky Atlantic on the 27th December 2021. The series stars Olivia Colman and David Thewlis. 

On 30 May 2015, 13-year-old Amber Peat went missing from home after returning from a family holiday. On 2 June her body was found in an area off Westfield Lane, Mansfield, less than a mile from her home. The cause of her death was hanging. An inquest was held at Nottingham Council House in February 2019, with the assistant-Coroner recording a narrative verdict.

In late December 2020, a cliff-face collapsed after heavy rain close to a recent housing development in an old sand quarry. On both occasions evacuation was necessary. The area was acknowledged as suitable for housing in 1998, with the estate developed by Gladedale Homes between 2003 and 2011. A stand of mature trees was marked as needing removal in anticipation of stabilising the nearby cliff face during 2018.

Cultural
D. H. Lawrence, in Lady Chatterley's Lover, described Mansfield as "that once romantic now utterly disheartening colliery town".

Notable people

People with Wikipedia pages, in alphabetical order:
Rebecca Adlington OBE (born 1989), Olympic bronze and gold medallist swimmer
Steve N Allen, comedian, TV & Radio broadcaster, star of award-winning shows "The Mash Report" and "Late Night Mash"
Richard Bacon (born 1975), broadcaster
John Balance (1962–2004), singer/musician with Coil
James Collinson (1826-1881), Victorian painter 
Kris Commons (born 1983), Celtic F.C. footballer
Nicholas Crafts (born 1949), economic historian 
Stephen Critchlow (1966-2021), radio, TV and stage actor
Ed Davey (born 1965), British politician, Leader of the Liberal Democrats since 2019 
Craig Disley (born 1981), Grimsby Town F.C. footballer
Robert Dodsley (1704–1767), playwright and poet, wrote The King and The Miller of Mansfield and Sir John Cockle, performed at Drury Lane in 1736 and 1737 respectively
Wes Dolan (born 1980), actor and singer/songwriter
Suzanne Eggins, a linguist in Australia
Watson Fothergill (1841–1928), Victorian architect
Elspeth Gibson (born 1963), Nottingham-born fashion designer, studied at Mansfield College of Art and Design.
Harry Harpham (1954–2016), coal miner and MP for Sheffield Brightside and Hillsborough
Mark Holmes (born 1960), lead singer of Canadian new wave rock group Platinum Blonde
Mark Henderson (born 1957), Tony award winning lighting designer
Sir Richard Jebb, 1st Baronet (1729–1787), physician to the Royal Family
Rob Kozluk (born 1977), footballer
Ric Lee (born 1945), drummer with Ten Years After
Sir Richard Leese (born 1951), local politician in Manchester
Leo Lyons (born 1943), bassist, songwriter, producer with Ten Years After
Alexander Malcolm (1864-1956), former member of parliament in New Zealand 
Charles James Martin (1886-1955), artist 
William Martin (1767–1810), naturalist, born in Mansfield 1767.
John Ogdon (1937–1989), pianist, born in Mansfield Woodhouse
Steve Ogrizovic, footballer born in Mansfield
Greg Owen (born 1972), professional golfer
Carly Paoli, opera singer (born 1989)
Joel Peat, lead guitarist of the band Lawson
James Perch (born 1985), Mansfield Town footballer
Tom Scott (born 1984), YouTuber and former TV presenter 
Sir Charles Seely, 2nd Baronet (1859-1926), British Industrialist
Alvin Stardust (1942–2014), pop singer 
Steve Ward (born 1957), accoladed as oldest active professional boxer
John Bainbridge Webster (1955–2016), Professor of Divinity at St Mary's College, University of St Andrews.
John Whetton (born 1941), track runner
Helen Wilson (1864-1951), a physician and social purity campaigner
Oliver Wilson (born 1980), professional golfer
Glenis Willmott (Dame) - Medical Scientist and former Leader of the European Parliamentary Labour Party, aged 10 was raised in the town.
Pollyanna Woodward – TV presenter 
Cassie Bradley - Actress raised in Nottingham and Mansfield.
Andrea Adams - BBC Broadcaster and Journalist.
Dorothy Atkinson - Actress and singer.
John Darrell (born 1562) - Anglican Clergyman known for his puritan views and practice as an Exorcist.
Richard Sterne (bishop) (born 1596) - Archbishop of York in 1664.
William Chappell (bishop) (born 1582) - English Scholar and Clergyman. 
Samuel Jebb (born 1694) - English Physician and literary scholar.

Twin towns – sister cities

Mansfield is twinned with:
 Heiligenhaus, Germany
 Mansfield, Massachusetts, United States
 Mansfield, Ohio, United States
 Reutov, Russia
 Stryi, Ukraine

See also
Mansfield District (council area)
Mansfield (UK Parliament constituency)
Mayor of Mansfield
Cantamus Girls Choir
Portland College
St Peter and St Paul's Church, Mansfield
St John's Church, Mansfield
St Mark's Church, Mansfield
St Philip Neri Church, Mansfield
A Spire for Mansfield

Notes

References

External links

Mansfield District Council Official site
Mansfield regeneration site
Mansfield BID Official site

 
Towns in Nottinghamshire
Market towns in Nottinghamshire
Unparished areas in Nottinghamshire
Mansfield District